General Francis Marion Bamberg (1838–1905), the builder of the General Francis Marion Bamberg House, played an important role in the growth of the town and county of Bamberg, South Carolina. Among other accomplishments, General Bamberg promoted the educational, religious, economic and cultural growth of the town of Bamberg, gave a library and gymnasium to the Carlisle Fitting School, and significant sums for the construction of a Methodist church.  The house, located in one of Bamberg's oldest residential areas, was listed in the National Register of Historic Places on June 29, 1976.

References

Houses on the National Register of Historic Places in South Carolina
Queen Anne architecture in South Carolina
Houses completed in 1869
Houses in Bamberg County, South Carolina
National Register of Historic Places in Bamberg County, South Carolina
1869 establishments in South Carolina